United States gubernatorial elections were held on November 6, 1984, in 13 states and two territories.  The Republicans had a net gain of one seat in this election, which coincided with the Senate, House elections and presidential election.

This was the last year in which Arkansas held a gubernatorial election in the same year as the presidential election. The length of gubernatorial terms for Arkansas' governor would be extended from two years to four years with elections taking place in midterm election years following the passage of the Sixty-third Amendment to the Arkansas Constitution.

Election results

See also
1984 United States elections
1984 United States presidential election
1984 United States Senate elections
1984 United States House of Representatives elections

References

 
November 1984 events in the United States